Mendenhall is an unincorporated community in Kennett Township in Chester County, Pennsylvania, United States. Mendenhall is located at the intersection of Pennsylvania Route 52 and Hillendale Road.

References

Unincorporated communities in Chester County, Pennsylvania
Unincorporated communities in Pennsylvania